Calla is the self-titled first album of the New York-based indie rock band Calla.

Track listing
All tracks by Calla

 "Tarentula" – 5:06
 "Custom Car Crash" – 2:44
 "June" – 4:54
 "Only Drowning Men" – 8:01
 "Elsewhere" – 5:33
 "Truth About Robots" – 2:36
 "Trinidad" – 3:16
 "Keyes" – 3:52
 "Awake and Under" – 3:53

Personnel 

 Sean Donovan – Bass, Keyboards, Programming, Engineer
 Aurelio Valle – Guitar, Vocals

1999 debut albums
Calla (band) albums
Arena Rock Recording Company albums